Kristen Lippincott is a London-based art historian and museums consultant.  From 1990 to 2006 she worked for the National Maritime Museum, and was its Deputy Director (2000–2006) after being Director of the Royal Observatory, Greenwich (1998–2001).

In October 2013 she appeared on BBC Radio 4's The Museum of Curiosity and chose to donate "The Eureka Moment" to the hypothetical museum.

She has a BA in Comparative Literature from Bennington College, Vermont, USA (1976) and an MA (1976) and PhD (1987) in Art History from the University of Chicago.

References

External links
 includes list of publications

Year of birth missing (living people)
Living people
People associated with the National Maritime Museum
American art historians
Women art historians
American women historians
21st-century American women